Sandi Patti and the Friendship Company is the eleventh studio and first Children's music album by Christian singer Sandi Patti, released in 1989 on Word Records. The theme on this album is about friendship and how special children are to  God. The album features a children's choir and Gerbert, a popular children's character based on the late 1980s television series of the same name that teaches children about kindness and friendship, making good choices, the importance of loving your neighbor and learning a valuable lesson in life, which is pretty much what this album is about. Sandi Patti and the Friendship Company went to No. 1 on the Billboard Top Christian Albums chart and would win her a GMA Dove Award for Children's Music Album of the Year at the 21st GMA Dove Awards.

Track listing

Charts

Radio singles

Accolades
GMA Dove Award
1990 Female Vocalist of the Year

References

1989 albums
Sandi Patty albums
Word Records albums
Children's music albums